Phocas (5475 October 610) was Eastern Roman emperor from 602 to 610. Initially, a middle-ranking officer in the Eastern Roman army, Phocas rose to prominence as a spokesman for dissatisfied soldiers in their disputes with the court of the Emperor Maurice. When the army revolted in 602, Phocas emerged as the natural leader of the mutiny. The revolt proved to be successful and led to the capture of Constantinople and the overthrow of Maurice on 23 November 602 with Phocas declaring himself emperor on the same day.

Phocas deeply mistrusted the uncooperative elite of Constantinople to whom he was a usurper and a provincial boor. He, therefore, attempted to base his regime on relatives whom he installed in high military and administrative positions. He immediately faced multiple challenges in domestic and foreign affairs to which he responded with little success. He dealt with domestic opposition with increasing ruthlessness which alienated even wider circles, including some members of his own household. At the same time, the Empire was threatened on multiple frontiers. Avars and Slavs renewed their destructive raids of the Balkans, and the Sassanid Empire launched a massive invasion of the eastern provinces. Finally, the Exarch of Africa, Heraclius the Elder, rebelled against Phocas and gained wide support throughout the empire. Phocas attempted to use border troops to crush the rebellion, which however only resulted in allowing the foreign invaders to break into the heartlands of the Empire. Heraclius the Elder's son, Heraclius, succeeded in taking Constantinople on 5 October 610, and executed Phocas on the same day, before declaring himself the emperor.

Surviving sources are universally extremely hostile to Phocas. He is described as an incompetent tyrant and usurper who brutally purged any real or perceived opposition and left the Empire wide open to foreign aggression. The veracity of these sources is difficult to ascertain since emperors of the Heraclian dynasty who succeeded Phocas had a vested interest in tarnishing his reputation.

Life

Early life
Phocas was probably born in 547, as he was said to be aged 55 when he became emperor. He and his family were likely of Thraco-Roman or Cappadocian origin. The life of Phocas before his usurpation of the Byzantine Empire's throne is obscure, but it is known that he served as a low-ranking officer under Emperor Maurice.

Usurpation
In 602, the Byzantine army rebelled against Emperor Maurice, largely due to exhaustion and outrage over orders to continue campaigning north of the Danube in winter as well as previous cuts in wages. The army declared Phocas, by then a centurion, to be the new emperor, raising him on a shield (the traditional method of declaring emperors). On 23 November 602, Phocas was crowned by the patriarch Cyriacus in the church of St John the Baptist at the Hebdomon. He entered Constantinople two days later, on 25 November.

Maurice fled the city with his sons, Theodosius and Tiberius, but they were soon after captured and executed. Maurice's wife and daughters were put in the monastery of Nea Metanoia and later killed.

Foreign conflict
Despite the executions of the previous emperor and his dynastic successors, Phocas remained in a precarious position, which led him to devote his energy to purging enemies and destroying conspiracies. Because of this focus, and the local resistance he faced all throughout the Byzantine Empire, he was unable to confront foreign attacks on the empire's frontiers. The Avars and Slavs launched numerous raids into the Balkan provinces of the Byzantine Empire, and the Sassanian Empire launched an invasion of the eastern provinces of the empire.

The Avars were able to take all land in the Balkans north of Thessalonica. The populations of Christian cities were slaughtered or captured. The Byzantines transferred most of their forces to the eastern front due to the threat from the Persians.

The Sassanid Persians had formerly been at peace with Maurice as a result of a treaty they made with him in 591. After Phocas usurped and killed Maurice, the Persians invaded the empire in 603.  The Sassanids rapidly occupied the eastern provinces, leading the Magister militum per Orientem, Narses, to defect to their side. Phocas swiftly dealt with him, by inviting him to Constantinople under the promise of safe conduct, then having him burnt alive when he arrived. By 607, the Sassanids had occupied Mesopotamia, Syria, and much of Asia Minor, as far as the Bosphorus.

By the time his reign ended in 610, the Persians had already crossed the Euphrates and taken Zenobia. Contemporary accounts describe the Persians as being very brutal to the occupied population. The 'miracle of St Demetrios' described the carnage:

[T]he devil raised the whirlwind of hatred in all the East, Cilicia, Asia, Palestine and all the lands from there to Constantinople: the factions, no longer content simply to spill blood in public places, attacked homes, slaughtered women, children, the aged, and the young who were sick; those whose youth and frailty impeded their escape from the massacre, [saw] their friends, acquaintances, and parents pillaged, and after all that, even set on fire so that the most wretched inhabitant was not able to escape.

Administration 
Phocas was unable to control either the state or the army effectively. Due to his distrust of the bulk of Constantinople's elite, with whom he had had no connection before becoming emperor, frequently filling senior military positions with his relatives. He installed: his brother Domentziolus as Magister officiorum in 603; his nephew Domentziolus as Magister militum per Orientem in 604, giving him command over the eastern provinces; and his brother Comentiolus as Magister militum per Orientem around 610. All three remained loyal to Phocas until they were killed by Heraclius. Of the three known male blood-relatives of Phocas, all three were appointed to senior posts, two in military positions and one in an administrative position. Phocas also appointed Priscus, who was his son-in-law by way of his marriage to Phocas' daughter Domentzia, as Comes excubitorum, the captain of the Excubitors, in 603.

Italian policy
When Phocas was emperor, Byzantine Italy was under continual attack from Lombards, but the Byzantine government spent few resources to aid Italy due to troubles elsewhere. In the entirety of Phocas' reign, the only public structure built with taxes in the city of Rome was a statue of Phocas completed in 608.

When Phocas usurped Maurice, Gregory the Great was bishop of Rome and he praised Phocas as a restorer of liberty. Gregory referred to him as a pious and clement lord, and compared his wife (the new Empress) Leontia to Marcian's consort Pulcheria (whom the Council of Chalcedon called the new Helena). In May 603, portraits of the imperial couple arrived in Rome and were ordered by the pope to be placed in the oratory of St. Caesarius in the imperial palace on the Palatine.

Imperial approval was needed at that time to appoint a new pope, but the approval was delayed by a year upon the death of Pope Sabinian in 606, as Phocas was occupied with killing internal enemies that threatened his rule. He finally gave approval in 607 and Boniface III became pope. Phocas declared Rome "the head of all churches". Shortly afterwards, Phocas had a gilded statue of himself erected on a monumental column in the Roman Forum, known as the Column of Phocas.

Downfall

Despite being appointed as Comes excubitorum, Priscus was not loyal to Phocas, and in 608 he appealed to Heraclius the Elder, the Exarch of Carthage, to rebel against Phocas. Heraclius the Elder agreed, and began to prepare to invade, by cutting off the supply of grain to Constantinople and assembling a large army and navy. Heraclius the Elder launched his invasion in 609, with his nephew, Nicetas, marching troops overland to the capital, and his son, Heraclius, leading a naval invasion of Thessalonica, before marching to Constantinople. Heraclius arrived outside Constantinople on 3 October 610, and seized the city on 5 October. Heraclius was declared emperor on the same day, and swiftly had Phocas executed.

Legacy 
Phocas is generally depicted as a villain by Byzantines and modern historians alike, but some of the earliest sources available about Phocas’ reign were written during the reign of Heraclius. The writings that survive are not reliably neutral and the writers would have good reason to demonize him in order to strengthen the rule of Heraclius.

In the cultural sphere, the reign of Phocas is marked by the change of Imperial fashion set by Constantine the Great. Constantine and all his successors, except Julian the Apostate, were beardless. Phocas again introduced the wearing of the beard. This fashion lasted until the end of the Byzantine Empire.

On 19 February 607, Emperor Phocas appointed Boniface III as the new bishop of Rome, then Phocas issued an imperial decree by the Roman government, recognizing Boniface III as the "Head of all Churches" and "Universal Bishop". Phocas transferred the title of "Universal Bishop" from Diocese of Constantinople to Diocese of Rome. Boniface sought and obtained a decree from Phocas in which he restated that "the See of Blessed Peter the Apostle should be the head of all the Churches" and ensured that the title of "Universal Bishop" belonged exclusively to the Bishop of Rome. This act effectively ended the attempt by Patriarch Cyriacus of Constantinople to establish himself as "Universal Bishop".

In calling the Pope the "head of all churches", Phocas' decree has been important in discussions about papal primacy and papal supremacy. Some Protestant historicist commentators have seen the decree of Phocas (usually taken to be in 606) as having eschatological significance. For example, in his Horae Apocalypticae, Edward Bishop Elliott took the 1260 days of Revelation 11:3 to be the period between 606 and the Unification of Italy in 1866.

References

Notes

Bibliography

External links

540s births
610 deaths
600s in the Byzantine Empire
6th-century Byzantine military personnel
7th-century Byzantine emperors
7th-century executions by the Byzantine Empire
7th-century murdered monarchs
Byzantine Cappadocians
Byzantine rebels
Executed Byzantine people
Executed monarchs
Imperial Roman consuls
Leaders who took power by coup
Leaders ousted by a coup
People executed by decapitation
People of the Byzantine–Sasanian War of 602–628
Roman-era Thracians